A Good Feelin’ to Know is the fourth studio album by the American country rock band Poco. The title track became the band's most recognizable tune from its early days. However, the album did not do as well commercially as expected, discouraging Richie Furay, who would leave the band after the release of the band's next album Crazy Eyes.

Reception

In his Allmusic review, music critic Bruce Eder wrote; "The album as a whole features a louder, harder-rocking sound a step or two removed from the country-rock they'd been known for... a curious throwback/advance. This album's relative failure made Richie Furay begin to lose faith in his own group's prospects."

Track listing
"And Settlin' Down" (Richie Furay) – 3:41
"Ride the Country" (Paul Cotton) – 6:25
"I Can See Everything" (Timothy B. Schmit) – 3:32
"Go and Say Goodbye" (Stephen Stills) – 2:46
"Keeper of the Fire" (Cotton) – 4:20
"Early Times" (Cotton) – 4:23
"A Good Feelin' to Know" (Furay) – 3:53
"Restrain" (Schmit) – 5:13
"Sweet Lovin'" (Furay) – 6:23

Charts

Personnel
Paul Cotton – guitar, vocals
Richie Furay – guitar, vocals
Rusty Young – steel guitar, guitar, vocals
Timothy B. Schmit – bass, vocals
George Grantham - drums, vocals
With:
Barry Flast – piano

Production
Producer: Jack Richardson, Jim Mason

References

Poco albums
1972 albums
Albums produced by Jack Richardson (record producer)
Epic Records albums